Reginald Till (17 September 1895 – 1978) was a British painter. His work was part of the painting event in the art competition at the 1948 Summer Olympics.

References

1895 births
1978 deaths
20th-century British painters
British male painters
Olympic competitors in art competitions
Place of birth missing
19th-century British male artists
20th-century British male artists